Black Aces is a 1937 American Western film directed by Buck Jones and written by Frances Guihan. The film stars Buck Jones, Kay Linaker, Robert Frazer, Raymond Brown, Fred MacKaye, Bob Kortman and Ben Corbett. The film was released on September 5, 1937, by Universal Pictures.

Plot
The plot is built around rancher Ted Ames and  daughter of a rancher Sandy McKenzie and their involvement with the notorious blackmailing gang the Black Aces.

Cast       
Buck Jones as Ted Ames
Kay Linaker as Sandy McKenzie
Robert Frazer as Homer Truesdale
Raymond Brown as Henry Kline
Fred MacKaye as Len Stoddard
Bob Kortman as Wolf Whalen 
Ben Corbett as Bridge Guard
W. E. Lawrence as Henchman Boyd Loomis
Frank Campeau as Cowhand Ike Bowlaigs
Robert McKenzie as Mailman Hank Farnum 
Charles Le Moyne as Sheriff Joe Potter 
Lee Shumway as Henchman
Arthur Van Slyke as Prospector Silver-Tip Joe
Charles King as Jess Walker
Barney Phillips as Jake Stoddard 
Silver as Silver

References

External links
 

1937 films
American Western (genre) films
1937 Western (genre) films
Universal Pictures films
American black-and-white films
1930s English-language films
1930s American films